Aadchit El Chqif, or simply Aadchit, is a village in the Nabatieh Governorate region of southern Lebanon located north of the Litani River.

History
In 1875, Victor Guérin found it to be a village of 350 Metualis. The villagers had a mosque.

References

Bibliography

External links
 Aadchit Ech Chaqif, Localiban

Populated places in Nabatieh District
Shia Muslim communities in Lebanon